This page details statistics, records, and other achievements pertaining to Gary Gait.

Professional career statistics and achievements

National Lacrosse League

Source: NLL.com

Major League Lacrosse

Source: majorleaguelacrosse.com

National Lacrosse League Achievements
 7-time regular season leader, total goals (1995–99, 2003, 2004)
 2-time regular season leader, total assists (1991, 1997)
 7-time regular season leader, total points (1991, 1995, 1997–00, 2004)

Championship Game
 played in 7 championship games (1 Detroit, 4 Philadelphia and 2 Baltimore)
 does not hold any Championship Game records
Rank among NLL Championship Game leaders in other stats:
 3rd, goals, career (21)
 4th, assists, career (15)

Playoffs
Holds NLL Playoff Records for:
 goals, career (65)

All-Star Game

 selected 4 times
 does not hold any All-Star Game records
Rank among NLL All-Star Game leaders in other stats:
 2nd, goals, game (5)
Behind Mark Steenhuis (6)
 2nd, points, game (8)
scored 5 goals and 3 assists for 8 points (1991 All-Star game)
Behind Paul Cantabene (10)
 5th, goals, career (6)
Tied with Gavin Prout

Regular season
Holds NLL regular season records for:
 MVP honors (6)
The only other player to win multiple MVP Awards is John Tavares (3)
 consecutive MVP honors (5)
 All-Pro Team honors (15)
 consecutive All-Pro Team honors (15)
 All-Pro First Team honors (14)
 consecutive All-Pro First Team honors (14)
 goals per game, career (3.425)
 goals, game (10)
Set vs. the Toronto Rock on January 9, 1999
Shared with his brother, Paul
Rank among NLL regular season leaders in other stats:
 2nd, goals, career (596)
 3rd, assists, career (495)
 7th, assists per game, career (2.845)
 2nd, points, career (1,091)
 3rd, points per game, career (6.270)
 5th, loose balls, career (1076)
 2nd, goals, season (61)
Also holds 3rd and 4th for this record
 9th, assists, season (62)
 3rd, points, season (112)
 2nd, shots on goal, season (253)
Also holds 3rd place for this record
 6th, loose balls, season (120)
 3rd, points, game (14)

Philadelphia Wings franchise records
Holds Philadelphia Wings records for:
 goals, 10-game season (43)
 assists, 10-game season (32)
 points, 10-game season (72)
 points, 8-game season (48)
 shots on goal, 10-game season (126)
 shots on goal, 8-game season (132)
Rank among Philadelphia Wings leaders in other stats:
 5th, goals, career (150)
 7th, assists, career (102)
 7th, points, career (252)
 6th, goals, season (43)
Also holds 10th place for this record

Colorado Mammoth franchise records
Holds Colorado Mammoth records for:
 games played, career (113)
 goals, career (387)
 assists, career (335)
 points, career (722)
 goals, season (61)
Also holds 2nd, 3rd, 5th, 6th, 7th and 10th place for this record
 shots on goal, season (244)
Also holds 2nd, 4th, 6th and 7th place for this record
 goals, game (10)*
 goals, 16-game season (61)
 goals, 14-game season (43)
 goals, 12-game season (57)
 assists, 14-game season (47)
 points, 14-game season (90)
 points, 12-game season (85)
 shots on goal, 16-game season (253)
 shots on goal, 14-game season (146)
 shots on goal, 12-game season (157)
Rank among Colorado Mammoth leaders in other stats:
 3rd, loose balls, career (655)
 3rd, assists, season (62)
Also holds 8th and 9th place for this record
 2nd, points, season (96)
Also holds 3rd, 7th, 9th and 10th place for this record
 8th, loose balls, season (120)

*NLL record

Coaching records
 Gary Gait does not hold any coaching records
Rank among NLL coaching leaders in other stats:
 2nd, regular season win percentage, career (%68.75)
 4th, postseason win percentage, career (%75.00)

Major League Lacrosse Achievements
 Scored 3 (hat trick) or more goals in 34 games (31 regular season, 3 postseason)
 Scored 6 goals (sock trick) in 4 games (2 regular season, 2 postseason)
 1-time regular season leader, total goals (2005)
 1-time regular season leader, total points (2005)
 1-time regular season leader, total hat tricks (2005)

Post season
Holds MLL post season records for:
 goals, career (29)
 points, career (35)
 hat tricks, career (3)
There is a 5-way tie for this record
 shots, career (72)
 power play assists, game (2)
Set vs. the Long Island Lizards in the 2002 Championship Game on September 1
Rank among MLL post season leaders in other stats:
 5th, assists, career (8)
Tied with Ryan Boyle
 8th, ground balls, career (24)

Regular season
Holds MLL regular season records for:
 overtime goals, career (2)
There is a 4-way tie for this record
 overtime points, career (2)
There is an 8-way tie for this record
Rank among MLL regular season leaders in other stats:
 6th, goals, career (159)
 5th, hat tricks, career (31)
 12th, assists, career (62)
 8th, points, career (222)
 9th, shots, career (435)

Career Highs
Regular season:
 goals: 6 (2 times)
 assists: 4 (3 times)
 points: 8 (2 times)

Postseason:
 goals: 6 (2 times)
 assists: 4 (September 1, 2002 vs. Long Island Lizards)
 points: 7 (August 24, 2003 vs. Long Island Lizards)
 power play assists: 2 (September 1, 2002 vs. Long Island Lizards)*

*MLL record

Other Interesting Notes
 Games in which Gait was leading scorer (or tied for leading scorer): 20 (17 regular season, 3 post season)
 Games in which Gait was team's leading scorer (or tied for leading scorer): 23 (20 regular season, 3 post season)

College career statistics and achievements

Syracuse University

(a) 2nd in NCAA single-season goals
(b) 3rd in NCAA career goals

NCAA tournament
 1-time NCAA tournament Most Outstanding Player
 4-time All-Tournament Team
 2-time Tournament leader, total points (1988, 1990)
Holds NCAA tournament records for:
 goals, career (50)
 goals, game (9)
Set vs. Navy on May 22, 1988
Shared with Oliver Brown
 goals, quarterfinal (9)
Set vs. Navy on May 22, 1988
 points, game (12)
Set vs. Navy on May 22, 1988
Shared with Ed Mullen
Rank among NCAA tournament leaders in other stats:
 2nd, goals, tournament (15)
Set during the 1990 tournament
Held for 16 years until Matt Ward broke it in 2006 with 16 (Ward played in 4 games in 2006 while Gait played in only 3 in 1990 because Syracuse had a Bye in the first round of the 1990 tournament)
Also holds 3rd place for this record with 14 goals (1988)
 3rd, goals, championship game (5)
Set during the 1990 Championship Game
Tied with many

Career and season NCAA records
 3rd, career goals (192)
 2nd, goals in a season (70)
 4th, career goals per game (3.43)
 18th, career points (253)
 5th, goals per game, season (4.67)
 3rd, points, game (12)
Set May 22, 1988 vs. Navy
 3rd, goals, game (9)
Set May 22, 1988 vs. Navy

Syracuse men's lacrosse records
 goals, career (192)
 goals per game, career (3.43)
 goals, season (70)
 goals per game, season (4.67)
 goals, game (9)
 goals, tournament (15, 1990)
 goals, tournament game (9)*
Set May 22, 1988 vs. Navy
 points, tournament game (12)*
Set May 22, 1988 vs. Navy

Hall of Fame Inductions
 US Lacrosse National Hall of Fame – November 12, 2005
 National Lacrosse League Hall of Fame – February 23, 2006 – Charter Class

Awards
 NLL Most Valuable Player Award: 1995, 1996, 1997, 1998, 1999, 2003
 NLL Championionship Game MVP Award: 1991, 1995
 NLL Sportsmanship Award: 2004 (tie), 2005
 NLL Rookie of the Year Award: 1991
 NLL Player of the Month: 6 times
 NLL Player of the Week: 7 times (1994–2001)
 NLL Overall Player of the Week: 6 times (2002–2005)
 NLL Offensive Player of the Week: 3 times
 MLL Most Valuable Player Award: 2005 (tie)
 MLL Championship Game MVP Award: 2005
 MLL All-Star MVP Award: 2004
 MLL Offensive Player of the Week: 2 times
 MLL Most Valuable Player of the Game Award: 12 times
 Lt. Raymond Enners Award (NCAA Player of the Year): 1988, 1990
 McLaughlin Award: 1988, 1989
 NCAA tournament Most Outstanding Player: 1990

Honours
 3-time All-World Team (1990, 1994, 1998)
 14-time NLL All-Pro First Team (1991-2004)
 1-time NLL All-Pro Second Team (2005)
 2-time All-MLL Team (2004, 2005)
 3-time All-American First Team (1988, 1989, 1990)
 1-time All-American Honorable Mention (1987)
 4-time NCAA All-Tournament Team (1987, 1988, 1989, 1990)
 Named to Lacrosse Magazine's All-20th Century Team
 Named to the NCAA's 25th Anniversary Team

Team honours
 Three NCAA National Championships - Syracuse University: 1988, 1989, 1990
 Two Mann Cups - Victoria Shamrocks: 1997, 1999
 Three NLL Championships - Detroit Turbos: 1991 - Philadelphia Wings: 1994, 1995
 Three MLL Steinfeld Cups - Long Island Lizards: 2001 - Baltimore Bayhawks: 2002, 2005
 Heritage Cup - Canada: 2004
 World Championship - Canada: 2006

Coaching honours
 Seven NCAA Women's National Championships - University of Maryland Assistant Coach: 1995, 1996, 1997, 1998, 1999, 2000, 2001
 NLL Champion's Cup - Colorado Mammoth Head Coach: 2006
 Two MLL Steinfeld Cups - Baltimore Bayhawks Player-Coach: 2002, 2005

Physical statistics
 Height: 
 Weight:

See also
NCAA Men's Division I Lacrosse Records

References
 Inside Lacrosse
 National Lacrosse League Career Stats
 The Outsider's Guide to the NLL
 Major League Lacrosse Record Books

External links
 Rochester Knighthawks Player Profile
 Gary Gait: MLL Player Profile at Pointstreak.com
 Gary Gait: NLL Player Profile at Pointstreak.com
 Gary Gait National Hall of Fame Biography
 Gary Gait Coaching record at Syracuse
 1987 Syracuse Men's Lacrosse Statistics
 1989 Syracuse Men's Lacrosse Statistics
 1990 Syracuse Men's Lacrosse Statistics

Gait, Gary